The School of Law, University of Mumbai is a public institution for undergraduate legal education in India. It is established under Department of Law, University of Mumbai and is situated at the University of Mumbai, Thane Sub Campus, Thane, Mumbai. The college is the one of the two law colleges in Mumbai University to offer B.B.A. - LL.B. Course, the other being University of Mumbai Law Academy. School of Law is a University administered Institution. The Campus also houses Institute of Distance & Open Learning and Management courses.

Admissions 
Admissions to undergraduate courses happen through the Maharashtra Law CET. Maharashtra. It is conducted every year for the admission in undergraduate Legal Courses by Maharashtra Government.

Infrastructure 
The College was built on a budget of 3 crore Rupees. The building is situated at the newly built sprawling 6.5 acre University of Mumbai Campus in Thane,

It has the following amenities:

Library
Computer Lab
Moot Court Hall
Legal Aid Clinic
In-house Canteen
Reading Room
Common Rooms
Auditorium

Academics

Undergraduate

School of Law offers a five-year integrated B.B.A.-LL.B.(Hons.) Program. It offers 60 seats each year. SoL follows a semester system with End Semester Exams happening every December and May. 75% Attendance is strictly mandatory and Bar Council dress code is followed by students.

Extracurriculars

Students are regularly provided with guest lectures on current issues and are taken for court visits and seminars.

Moot Court & Debate Competitions

The Students of School of Law have participated in many Moot Court Competitions and have its own Moot Court Association
SoL conducts intra as well as freshre's moot court every year.

Students have achieved and participated in:
IM Nanavati Memorial Moot Court competition -2018
BCI National Moot Court
KES Law College Case Probe Competition - 2017
10th National Moot Court Competition, K.C. Law College, Chuchgate
Investigative Court Room Trial, D.Y. Patil Law College, Navi Mumbai
Intra-College Moot Court Competition, Fort Campus, Fort
Gnaritus - Model United Nations(MUN)
Intra-Collegiate Debate Competitions
GLC MUN - 2017

Legal Aid Clinic

The  Legal Aid Clinic (or committee, as is the practice now), established under Legal Service Authorities Act, 1987 which reads as "Develop, in consultation with the Bar Council of India, programs for clinical legal education and promote guidance and supervise the establishment and working of legal services clinics in universities, law colleges and other institutions". The Legal Aid Clinic at School of Law, University of Mumbai aims to provide every citizen with legal help, summary advice, self-help, community legal education, community development and various legal awareness program which is to be run Professors and students of School of Law, University of Mumbai.

Fest

School of Law undertakes annual fest every fall that has many competitions and games and celebrations. The University of Mumbai, Thane Sub Campus organises its own cultural festival as well as annual utsav "Khwaish".  It consists of youth oriented events and is organised and managed by the students.  It has participation from several colleges and encourages students to showcase their talent on a bigger platform. There are more than thirty events, cultural and academic.
 Khwaish 2017
Slogan - "DREAM"-In the City of Dreams, make a wish and be a part of Khwaइश‘17!

Culture
The College celebrates all the festivals throughout the year and has annual Week of Celebrations in Winter.

See also
Legal education in India
List of law schools in India
List of colleges in Mumbai
University of Mumbai

Gallery

References

Law schools in Maharashtra
Universities in Mumbai
Educational institutions established in 1855
Affiliates of the University of Mumbai
Legal research
1855 establishments in India